Panek is a Czech and Polish surname. The name derives either from Pan, which means Polish sir or master. Notable people with the surname include:

Anita Dolly Panek, Brazilian biochemist 
Jerry Panek, Polish-American skier
Maciej Panek, Prezes Panek S.A.
Yolanda Panek (1974 – disappeared 1995), American female murder victim
Zbyněk Pánek, Czech skier

See also
Baronet